DCAG may refer to:

 Attorney General for the District of Columbia, in Washington, DC
 Deputy Air Wing Commander, of a United States Navy carrier air wing